Basketball Club Vienna, for sponsorship reasons BC GGMT Vienna, is an Austrian professional basketball club based in Vienna. It plays in the Austrian Basketball Superliga and has won the Austrian championship one time, in 2013.

History
The team was founded in 2001 as Basketball Club Vienna.

The first championship in club history came in the 2012–13 season, after Vienna beat Oberwart Gunners 3–2 in the Finals.

In September 2015, the team was renamed to "BC Hallmann Vienna", after new main sponsor Hallmann Holding of owner Klemens Hallmann.

Sponsorship names
Due to sponsorship reasons, the team has had several names:
BC Vienna (2001–2013)
BC Zepter Vienna (2013–2015)
BC Hallmann Vienna (2015–2020)
BC GGMT Vienna (2020–present)

Trophies
Austrian Basketball Bundesliga
Champions (2): 2012–13, 2021–22
Alpe Adria Cup
Runners-up (1): 2022–23

Logos

Season by season

Notable players
 Ryan Richards
 Žarko Rakočević
 Ian Boylan
 Andre Owens
 Richaud Pack

Coaches

References

External links
Official website
Eurobasket.com BC Vienna Page

Basketball teams in Austria
Sports clubs in Vienna
2001 establishments in Austria
Basketball teams established in 2001